Foursquare Labs Inc., commonly known as Foursquare, is an American-based technology company and data cloud platform. The company's location platform is the foundation of several business and consumer products, including the Foursquare City Guide and Foursquare Swarm apps. Foursquare’s products include: Pilgrim SDK, Places, Visits, Attribution, Audience, Proximity, and Unfolded Studio. 

Dennis Crowley and Naveen Selvadurai founded the company in late 2008 and launched it in 2009. The company rose to prominence with the launch of its namesake local search-and-discovery mobile app, now known as Foursquare City Guide. This app popularized the concept of real-time location-sharing and checking-in, especially in urban environments. Alongside the changes to the consumer apps, the company began creating products that leverage the location data collected via billions of check-ins.

In May 2019, Foursquare acquired Placed from Snap Inc. In April 2020, Foursquare announced a merger with Factual Inc. In May 2021, Foursquare acquired Unfolded, a platform for geospatial data unification, enrichment, visualization, and analytics.

History

Launch and early years
Co-founders Dennis Crowley and Naveen Selvadurai founded in 2008 and launched Foursquare City Guide in 2009 at SXSW. Crowley had previously founded the similar project Dodgeball as his graduate thesis project in the Interactive Telecommunications Program (ITP) at New York University and subsequently sold it to Google in 2005.

In November 2009, Foursquare opened up access to its API, enabling developers to access data generated by the Foursquare app and build applications on top of that data. Foursquare opened its second office, in San Francisco, the next year, shortly after reaching one million users. In 2011, Foursquare began working on Pilgrim, the core technology that combines stop-detection and snap-to-place functions in order to provide contextual awareness to Foursquare's apps, so they can proactively engage with users in real time.

Swarm release
In May 2014, the company launched Swarm, a companion app to Foursquare, that moved the social networking and location sharing aspects of the service to a separate application. On August 7, 2014, the company launched Foursquare 8.0, the completely new version of the service that shifted the focus from check ins to focus on local search and recommendations.

2015 to present 
In April 2015, Foursquare began offering location-based enterprise products for marketers and advertisers with the launch of Pinpoint. The company subsequently released Attribution, a tool for media performance measurement, in February 2016, and the Pilgrim software development kit, which allows developers to use Foursquare's core Pilgrim technology to add context into their own apps and services, in March 2017. Each of these tools can be used independently, or they can be bundled together.

On January 14, 2016, co-founder Dennis Crowley stepped down from his position as CEO. He moved to an Executive Chairman position while Jeff Glueck, the company's COO, succeeded Crowley as the new CEO.

In 2017, Foursquare hired more than 50 new staff members in various roles. Foursquare also announced its expansion in the Asia-Pacific region with partners like Tencent and Samsung and a new office in Singapore. Over the course of the three-year period from 2015 through 2017, the company's revenue grew by more than 50% each year. In early 2018, Foursquare opened a new engineering office in Chicago.

On December 6, 2019, Foursquare's Board of Directors announced the appointment of David Shim as Chief Executive Officer and Member of the Board.

In April 2020, Foursquare announced a merger with Factual Inc. in an all-stock deal.

On November 5, 2020 it was announced that David Shim was stepping down as Chief Executive Officer, to be replaced by Gary Little, a member of the company's board.

On May 20, 2021, Foursquare announced an agreement to acquire Unfolded, a next-generation platform for geospatial data unification, enrichment, visualization, and analytics. To solidify Foursquare’s location and geospatial technology and developer community.

Funding
Foursquare is principally funded by Union Square Ventures, Andreessen Horowitz, O'Reilly AlphaTech Ventures, DFJ Growth, Morgan Stanley Alternative Investment Partners, Spark Capital, and more. The company raised $1.35 million in its Series A round and $20 million in its Series B round. On June 24, 2011, Foursquare raised $50 million on a $600 million valuation. Their Series D round funding of $35 million was announced on December 19, 2013 and led by DFJ Growth.

In January 2016, the company raised $45 million in a series E funding round led by Union Square Ventures. Morgan Stanley participated along with previous investors: DFJ Growth, Andreessen Horowitz and Spark Capital. In October 2018, the company announced that it raised an additional $33 million in a series F funding round co-led by investors Simon Ventures and Naver, in addition to longstanding investor Union Square Ventures.

In May 2019, Foursquare bought Placed from Snap Inc.

Consumer Products

Rewards by Foursquare
In August 2021, the company relaunched Rewards, previously Foursquare’s Panel App. The app gives users the ability to make money in four steps: log in or create an account, enable location services, allow tracking, and earn points—either by completing surveys or keeping the app running in the background. The app, which also allows users to increase point collection by referring friends, gives users several choices for redeeming points by offering gift cards to popular companies (such as Isa, Amazon, Target, Sephora, Starbucks, and Gamestop) or entering sweepstakes for prizes like the Playstation 5, Xbox Series X, Amazon Fire TV Stick, or $5,000 cash.

Foursquare Swarm

In May 2014, the company launched Foursquare Swarm, a companion app to Foursquare City Guide, which migrated the social networking and location sharing aspects of the service into a separate application. Swarm acts as a lifelogging tool for users to keep a record of the places they have been, featuring statistics on the places they have been, and a search capability to recall places where they have checked in. Swarm also lets users share where they have been with their friends, and see where their friends have been. Though it is not necessary to use both apps, Swarm works together with Foursquare City Guide to improve a user's recommendations – a user's Swarm check-ins help Foursquare understand the kinds of places they like to go.

Marsbot
Launched in May 2016, Marsbot is a tool that helps users discover new places by learning what they like and then sending recommendations via text. Unlike a chatbot or virtual personal assistant, Marsbot does not answer questions. Instead, Marsbot learns about the places users go and then sends context-based suggestions about places to eat and drink nearby. Crowley has claimed that Marsbot is part of a larger vision of the future of location-based experiences for consumers. In October 2020, Foursquare released an audio AR version of Marsbot called Marsbot for AirPods, a "lightweight" virtual assistant that whispers location-specific guidance through users' bluetooth headphones.

Foursquare City Guide

Launched in March 2009, Foursquare City Guide is a local search and discovery mobile app that helps users discover new places from a community of peers. The app provides personalized recommendations of places to go near a user's current location based on the user's previous visits, likes and check-in history.

References

External links
 

 

2009 establishments in New York City
Companies based in Manhattan
Internet properties established in 2009
Online companies of the United States
Technology companies established in 2009
Restaurant guides